The Noida ATS shootings took place on 24 January 2009 between 1:00am and 1:30am local time in Noida, Uttar Pradesh, India, two days before the Republic Day of India. The Uttar Pradesh Anti Terrorism Squad officers killed two people, suspected to be Pakistani terrorists in the attack which took place near Noida's Sector 97 area, near Maha Maya college.

Shootout 

After receiving a tip-off, ATS agents chased a Maruti 800 car bearing a 'UP' number-plate. During the chase, the terrorists shot at the police officers who retaliated, causing the car to hit the rear tyre of the suspects' car, veering it off the road. ATS officers then took cover behind a roadblock and engaged the terrorists for 30 minutes in a fierce gun-battle. Officer Vinod Kumar sustained a bullet injury during the gunfight. The two terrorists ceased firing after sustaining multiple gunshot wounds and 
succumbed to their injuries while they were rushed to the hospital. Before their death one of them identified himself as Farooq from Akara and his aide as Abu Ismail from Rawalakot, both in Pakistan.

References

External links 
Video report by Times Of India

2009 crimes in India
Terrorist incidents in India in 2009
Crime in Noida
Law enforcement in Uttar Pradesh
Law enforcement operations in India
Encounters in India